The 2021 Italian government crisis was a political event in Italy that began in January 2021 and ended the following month. It includes the events that follow the announcement of Matteo Renzi, leader of Italia Viva (IV) and former Prime Minister, that he would revoke IV's support to the government of Giuseppe Conte.

On 18 and 19 January, Renzi's party abstained and the government won the key confidence votes in the Chamber and in the Senate, but it failed in reaching an absolute majority in the Senate. On 26 January, Prime Minister Conte resigned from his office, prompting President Sergio Mattarella to start consultations for the formation of a new government. On 13 February, Mario Draghi was sworn in as Prime Minister.

Background 

The 2018 general election produced a hung parliament. After long negotiations,  a coalition was finally formed on 1 June between two populist parties, centrist Five Star Movement (M5S) and right-wing League, led by the M5S-linked independent Giuseppe Conte as Prime Minister. This coalition ended with Conte's resignation on 20 August 2019 after the League withdrew its support of the government. In September 2019, a new government was formed between the M5S and two left-wing parties, the Democratic Party (PD) and Free and Equal (LeU), retaining Giuseppe Conte at its head. However, on 16 September, a few days from the investiture vote, in an interview with la Repubblica, former Prime Minister Matteo Renzi announced his intention to leave the PD, launching a new centrist and liberal party named Italia Viva (IV). In the interview, he confirmed continued support of Conte's government. Two ministers, Teresa Bellanova and Elena Bonetti, and one undersecretary, Ivan Scalfarotto, followed Renzi to his new movement.

Political crisis 

Between December 2020 and January 2021, discussions arose within the government coalition between Conte and Matteo Renzi, former Prime Minister and leader of Italia Viva. Renzi called for radical changes to the government's economic recovery plans after the COVID-19 pandemic, and also demanded that Conte cede his mandate over the secret services coordination task. During his end-of-year press conference, Conte declined Renzi's requests, asserting that he still had a majority in the Parliament.

On 13 January, during a press conference, Renzi announced the resignation of IV's two ministers, effectively triggering the collapse of Conte's government. Renzi stated: "We will not allow anyone to have full powers, we have started this government not to give them to Salvini. There is a dramatic emergency to face but it cannot be the only element that keeps the government alive. Responding to the pandemic means having the desire and need to unblock construction sites and act on industrial policies. There is a reason if Italy is the country with the highest number of deaths and GDP that collapses."

During a late-night Council of Ministers, Conte strongly criticised Renzi, stating that "Italia Viva has assumed the serious responsibility of opening a government crisis. I am sincerely sorry for the considerable damage that has been done to our country by a government crisis in the midst of a pandemic. If a party forces its ministers to resign, the gravity of this decision cannot be diminished." The Prime Minister was soon backed by the secretary of the Democratic Party, Nicola Zingaretti, who labeled the crisis as a "very serious mistake against Italy" and "an act against our country", while the Minister of Culture, Dario Franceschini, head of the Democratic delegation in the government, stated: "Whoever attacks the Prime Minister, attacks the entire government and Giuseppe Conte is serving the country with passion and dedication in the most difficult moment of our republican history". The Minister of Foreign Affairs and former leader of the M5S, Luigi Di Maio, described Renzi's decision as a "reckless move", asserting that Prime Minister Conte and President Sergio Mattarella are the two only pillars of Italy in a moment of uncertainty; while Roberto Speranza, Minister of Health and de facto leader of Free and Equal (LeU), said that Conte "has served the country with discipline and honor", adding that LeU still supported him. Moreover, many other prominent members of the cabinet like Stefano Patuanelli, Alfonso Bonafede, Vincenzo Spadafora and Riccardo Fraccaro expressed their support to Conte. The opposition leaders, Matteo Salvini and Giorgia Meloni, immediately asked for snap elections.

On 15 January, Conte announced that he would report about the government crisis in the parliament in the following week. On that occasion, he would also seek for a confidence vote to confirm the parliamentary support for the government.

Confidence vote for Conte's government 
On 18 January 2021, the government won the vote of confidence in the Chamber of Deputies with 321 votes in favour, 259 against and 27 abstentions. On the following day the government won a vote of confidence in the Senate with 156 votes in favor, 140 against and 16 abstentions; however, the cabinet was not able to reach the absolute majority in the Senate.

In both houses of Parliament, the Italia Viva groups abstained. The government also gained support from a few MPs who did not belong to the majority, such as three MPs from Forza Italia, one from More Europe, and others from the Mixed group.

Resignation of Conte and consultations

On 26 January, after a few days of inconclusive negotiations with centrist and independent senators to regain an absolute majority in the Senate, Conte resigned as Prime Minister. On the following day, a new parliamentary group, known as Europeanists, was formed in the Senate in support of Conte. The group was composed by members of the Associative Movement Italians Abroad (MAIE) and other centrist and liberal senators.

On 27 January, the consultations with President Sergio Mattarella for the formation of a new cabinet began at the Quirinal Palace, meeting the presidents of the two houses, senator Elisabetta Casellati and Roberto Fico.

On 28 January, President Mattarella met the delegations of For the Autonomies, Free and Equal and the new-born Europeanists, which confirmed their supports to Conte, as well as the independent MPs of the Mixed Group. Matteo Renzi, which was received in the afternoon along with Italia Viva's delegation, opened to a new government with the same old majority, but he opposed giving the task of forming a new cabinet to Conte, while Nicola Zingaretti, leader of the PD, stressed the necessity of starting a new government with Conte at its head.

On 29 January, the centre-right coalition, composed by the League (Lega), Brothers of Italy (FdI), Forza Italia (FI) and other conservative minor parties, was received by President Mattarella. Matteo Salvini, leader of the League, asked for snap election, otherwise he added that, at specific conditions, the centre-right could support a national unity government. The consultations ended with the Five Star Movement (M5S), whose leader, Vito Crimi, confirmed the support to Prime Minister Conte and opened to a return of Italia Viva within the majority. This statement caused the immediate reaction of Alessandro Di Battista, leader of the anti-establishment wing of the M5S, which threatened to exit from the party if Renzi will return to government.

Further negotiations and Draghi's mandate

At the end of the consultations, Mattarella gave the President of the Chamber, Roberto Fico, the task of verifying the possibility of a new government with the same majority of the previous one, composed by M5S, PD, IV and LeU.

On the deadline day of 2 February, IV broke away from the majority due to disagreements on both platform and cabinet members, leading Fico to head back to Mattarella with a negative outcome. Following the unsuccessful government formation, Mattarella invited Mario Draghi for the next day at the Quirinal Palace with the intention to offer him the task to form a technocratic government. On 3 February, Draghi officially accepted with reservation the task of forming a new cabinet and started the consultations with the presidents of the two houses. On the same day, he also met Giuseppe Conte, who officially endorsed him the following day.

On 10 February Matteo Salvini and Silvio Berlusconi, jointly announced, after a meeting, their support to Draghi. On the same day, Giorgia Meloni, leader of FdI, condemned the meeting of her two allies and reaffirmed her opposition to Draghi's government.

On 11 February, the national leadership of the Democratic Party unanimously voted in favour of the formation of a new cabinet.

On the same day, the M5S asked its members to vote on the following question: "Should the Movement support a technical-political government that will include a super-ministry for Ecological Transition and will defend the main results achieved by the Movement, alongside the other political forces indicated by the appointed prime minister Mario Draghi?" The party's members approved the online referendum with 59.3% of "yes" votes. Alessandro Di Battista opposed the party's decision of entering in the new government and left the party on 11 February 2021.

Formation of Draghi's government

On the evening of 12 February, Draghi met with President Mattarella and presented the list of proposed ministers for his cabinet. The oath of office took place on 13 February, at 12:00 PM local time.

On 17 February 2021, the Senate approved the new cabinet with 262 votes in favour, 40 against and 2 abstentions. It was the second largest majority in the history of the Italian Republic.
On 18 February 2021, the Chamber of Deputies approved the new cabinet with 535 votes in favour, 56 against and 5 abstentions.

See also

 2018 Italian general election
 2018 Italian government formation
 2008 Italian political crisis
 2019 Italian government crisis
 2022 Italian government crisis

References

Government crisis
Government crisis
Government crises
2021 government crisis
Giuseppe Conte